Nikolai Dmitrievich Bartram (Russian: Николай Дмитриевич Бартрам; 5 September 1873, Kursk Governorate ― 13 July 1931, Moscow) was an illustrator, poster designer, art historian, and collector from the Russian Empire and later the Soviet Union.

Biography 

His father, Dmitri Ernestovich Bartram, was a watercolor artist, who had a small workshop where he made toys. Nikolai learned to paint and draw at an early age. When he was sixteen, he began studying at the Moscow School of Painting, Sculpture and Architecture, but had to quit after two years, due to poor health. Back home, he organized a workshop for the manufacture of wooden toys, which he directed for ten years. 

He also studied the history of toys in Russia. This led him to the works of the historian, Ivan Zabelin, and the ethnographer, both of whom became acquaintances. He then began collecting toys, foreign and domestic, as well as making trips to the provinces to collect old clothing and household items.

From 1900 to 1903, he travelled throughout Europe; visiting toy shops and returning with suitcases of dolls, toy soldiers, and toy animals. He also developed an interest in children's books and created illustrations for several old Russian folktales. He organized a workshop there, making dolls with porcelain heads, dressed in folk costumes. His shop also created the first "architectural toys" in Russia; based on historic buildings and towers.

In 1912, he married the artist and collector, who joined him in his various enterprises. Many of the items displayed had been taken from nationalized estates, by the Bolshevik government. In 1924, it was moved to a nearby mansion. Bartram remained its Director until his death.  

He was a member of numerous organizations. In 1916, he was appointed Chairman of the Union of Decorative Arts and Art Industry Workers. Later he served as head of the Decorative Arts Commission at the People's Commissariat for Education, as well as belonging to their Commission for the Protection of Monuments of Art and Antiquity.

He died in 1931, aged only fifty-seven, and was interred at Novodevichy Cemetery. Shortly after his death, the toy museum was moved to Zagorsk. In 1980, it was moved to its current location in Sergiyev Posad.

References

Further reading 
 G. N. Bocharov,  Московский кустарный музей и деятельность Н. Д. Бартрама, Russian Art and Culture Series, Vol.4, 1980
 Nadezhda Polunina and Aleksander Frolov, Коллекционеры старой Москвы (Collectors of Old Moscow), Независимая Газета, 1997  (Ozon)

External links 

 Biography of Bartram @ the Sergiyev Posad website

1873 births
1931 deaths
People from Kursk Oblast
People from Lgovsky Uyezd
Illustrators from the Russian Empire
Soviet illustrators
Art historians from the Russian Empire
Directors of museums in the Russian Empire
Curators from Moscow
Moscow School of Painting, Sculpture and Architecture alumni
Curators from the Russian Empire